Clarence Eugene Davis (born June 28, 1949) is a former American football running back who played eight seasons in the National Football League (NFL).  He played for the Oakland Raiders from 1971 to 1978, having earlier played college football for the USC Trojans.

Early life
Davis was born in Birmingham, Alabama, on June 28, 1949.  He attended Washington Preparatory High School in Los Angeles.  He then studied at the University of Southern California, where he played for the USC Trojans from 1969 to 1970.  He was named an All-American during his senior year in 1969, when he led the Pac-8 Conference in rushing attempts (297), rushing yards (1357), rushing touchdowns (9), plays from scrimmage (300), and yards from scrimmage (1377).

In 1970, he was part of USC's "all-black" backfield (the first one of its kind in Division I (NCAA) history), that included fullback Sam Cunningham and quarterback Jimmy Jones.
Davis was one of the five USC African American starters (along with Sam Cunningham, Jimmy Jones, Charlie Weaver and Tody Smith), that played against an all-white University of Alabama football team, winning 42–21 in Birmingham on September 12, 1970. This game was historically significant, because it played a key role in convincing the University of Alabama and its fan base to accelerate the integration of its football team.

Professional career
Davis finished his rookie season with 734 return yards, 321 rushing yards, 97 receiving yards, and 2 total touchdowns. The most touchdowns he scored in a season was in his next season, where he scored 6 touchdowns (all rushing) with 71 attempts on 363 yards. 
In Super Bowl XI, he played a key role in the Raiders' 32–14 victory over the Minnesota Vikings, he rushed 16 times for 137 yards, an average of 8.6 yards. Davis, who had been plagued by a knee injury for three years, had runs of 20, 35, 13, 18, and 16 yards, part of a Raiders team that gained for 429 yards, a Super Bowl record at the time. In his penultimate season (1977, also his final full season), he collected 911 yards (787 rushing, 124 receiving) along with 268 yards on returns. In his last season, he played in only 2 games, rushing for 4 yards on 14 carries and catching 4 passes for 24 yards. In the span of his eight seasons, he had played in 89 games, rushing 804 times for 3,640 yards for 26 touchdowns along with 99 catches for 865 yards for 2 touchdowns and 2,140 return yards on 79 returns. His 27.1 yards per return ranks as 11th all time. In 12 total playoff games (including the aforementioned Sea of Hands Game), he rushed for 506 yards on 128 attempts with 2 touchdowns while catching 13 passes for 96 yards with one touchdown.

1974 Sea of Hands Catch
Clarence Davis' catch in a Sea of Hands ended one of the greatest NFL games of all-time, pitting the Oakland Raiders  against the Miami Dolphins in the 1974 NFL Playoffs. With 4:54 to play, Kenny Stabler completed a 72-yard touchdown pass to Cliff Branch. Branch went to the ground to make the catch, but being untouched by Dolphin defenders, he popped upright and ran the remaining 27 yards to complete the play. With 4:37 to go, the score was Raiders 21, Dolphins 19. A mere two minutes later, Miami had responded with a touchdown that gave them the lead again by five. With two minutes left in the game, the Raiders had one last chance. Stabler drove the Raiders to the Miami 8-yard line with 35 seconds left.  On 1st and goal, Stabler called a pass play, took the snap, and scrambled to his left.  Miami defensive end Vern Den Herder tripped Stabler from behind, but Stabler got off a floating pass toward Davis in the end zone before going down.  Davis, Miami defensive back Charlie Babb, and linebacker Mike Kolen all leaped for the ball at the same time and each got their hands on it.  Davis, however, out-wrestled Babb and Kolen for the ball and the winning score.  This 28–26 victory, with a combined three touchdowns scored by both teams in the final 4:37, made this Raiders comeback one of the most unforgettable in Dolphins-Raiders history.

The irony of the "Sea of Hands" catch lay in the fact that Davis was nicknamed "hands of wood" by some teammates for his difficulty catching balls out of the backfield.

Personal life
Davis has a son named Tyler Davis, who played college football at Missouri Valley College. Tyler was signed by the Miami Dolphins on January 4, 2016, becoming the first player to be signed from the German Football League straight to the NFL.

References

1949 births
Living people
American football running backs
East Los Angeles Huskies football players
Oakland Raiders players
USC Trojans football players
Players of American football from Birmingham, Alabama
Players of American football from Los Angeles